{{Infobox comedian
| name          = Karl Lucas
| birth_place   = Manchester, England, UK
| nationality   = British
| years_active  = 1995–present
| birth_name    = Karl John Lucas
| birth_date    = 

| notable_works = Peter Kay's Britain's Got the Pop Factor... and Possibly a New Celebrity Jesus Christ Soapstar Superstar Strictly on Ice (2008)Phoenix Nights (2001–02)Osbournes Reloaded. (2008–09)Ant and Dec's Saturday Night Takeaway (2002–present)Three Sony Awards (1999/2000). (2004)
}}

Karl John Lucas (born 27 March 1972) is an English comedian, actor and writer, who has written for and appeared in a number of television, music videos and radio comedy programmes, as well as various theatre productions.

Lucas worked on Galaxy 102's Breakfast show which collectively won three Sony Awards (1999/2000) —  Gold in 1999 and Silver in 2000 for Best Breakfast Show. Lucas was writer and comedy sidekick on the show and was awarded his own Sony Award (Bronze) for his part of the 'Sticker Vicar' in 1999.

Lucas is a graduate of the University of Salford, with a BA Honours and HND in Performing Arts. He graduated with distinction in 1996 and is listed on the Manchester Evening News' 'Hall of Fame'.

Lucas played Richard, a member of the fictional Pop group 2 Up, 2 down on Peter Kay's Britain's Got the Pop Factor... and Possibly a New Celebrity Jesus Christ Soapstar Superstar Strictly on Ice (2008) a spoof on the talent show genre of programmes. Some of the shows most memorable moments saw 2 Up 2 Down singing a duet with Rick Astley, getting Hip-Hop dance lessons off Lionel Blair and Richard's rap in the middle of "The Winner's Song" (co-written by Gary Barlow).

He is one of the only British comedians who has worked as a warm up on American TV shows: America's Got Talent and Osbournes Reloaded.

Karl is the sole director of Pink Walrus Productions Limited. 

Peter Kay
Lucas has worked closely with Peter Kay on many of his TV, DVD, Music and Stand-Up projects, as a Writer, Actor and Director. He was a Tour Manager for Peter Kay's Mum Wants a Bungalow Tour and filmed/directed a documentary called One Hundred and Eighty: The Tour Documentary. Lucas supports Comic Relief and has donated his time as a consultant writer/backstage director on the Comic Relief Charity singles "500 Miles" and "Is this the way to Amarillo", and has cameo appearances in both videos.

Writing
Lucas has written scripts, story lines, additional material, sketches and provided material for Peter Kay's Britain's Got the Pop Factor... and Possibly a New Celebrity Jesus Christ Soapstar Superstar Strictly on Ice, The Coronation Street Panto, Coronation Street, You've Been Framed, Ant and Dec's Saturday Night Takeaway, A Question of TV, Soap Fever, Loose Women, Max and Paddy's Power of Two, and Osbournes Reloaded in the U.S.

In 2011 he wrote and directed This Mornings first ever live Pantomime. Cinderella featured the regular cast in an all singing and dancing live spectacular.

TV appearances
 Derren Brown's Remote Control as Voice Over Man Shameless (Channel 4) as Branson 
 Emmerdale: The Dingles – For Richer for Poorer as Fridge (director: Tim O'Mara)
 Peter Kay's Britain's Got the Pop Factor... and Possibly a New Celebrity Jesus Christ Soapstar Superstar Strictly on Ice as Richard in (TwoUp-TwoDown) (director: Peter Kay)
 Raiders of the Pop Charts as Himself 
 Raiders of the Pop Charts II as Himself 
 Britain's Got The Pop Factor ... and Then Some! as Richard 
 Osbournes: Reloaded (Fox TV) as New Family Member Loose Women (ITV) Various Roles 
 Shameless (Channel 4) as Paramedic 
 Ideal (BBC) as Peter (Ginger Elvis) 
 Mischief "Is it coz I is Black?" (BBC) as Presenter (director: Sam Lewens)
 Waterloo Road (BBC) as Radio Presenter One Hundred and Eighty: The Tour Documentary as Himself 
 Peter Kay Night (Channel 4) as Himself 
 Max & Paddy's Power of Two (Channel 4) as Woman in Burka 
 Peter Kay Live at the Manchester Arena (Channel 4) as Himself 
 Celebrities Under Pressure (ITV) as Elvis 
 Phoenix Nights (Channel 4) as Ass TV Presenter Baz Hastings 
 You've Been Framed! (ITV) as Caretaker 
 Newsnight (BBC) as Himself (2002)
 Soap Fever (ITV) as various characters (with Emma Kennedy)

DVD appearances
 Emmerdale: The Dingles – For Richer for Poorer as Fridge (director: Tim O'Mara)
Britain's Got The Pop Factor ... And Possibly A New Celebrity Jesus Christ Soapstar Superstar Strictly On Ice (DVD) (2009)
Shameless (DVD) (2008)
 Special Kay (DVD) (2008)
Waterloo Road (DVD) (2007)Ideal (DVD) (2007)
 Peter Kay – Stand Up UKay (DVD) (2007)
 Max and Paddy's Power of Two (DVD)(2005)
 Live at the Manchester Arena (DVD) (2005)
Phoenix Nights (DVD)(2001–2002)

TV warm-up
Lucas has been a TV warm-up man since 1994. His first professional job in TV was a warm-up man on University Challenge. He has since worked on such shows as Loose Women Ant & Dec's Saturday Night Takeaway, Strictly Come Dancing, and The Voice UK. He also worked on Epic Win and Let's Do Lunch with Gino & Mel.

TV producing
Lucas worked in the USA as a Content Producer (2008–09) for Fremantle Media on Osbournes:Reloaded.

TV presenting
 Mischief "Is it coz I is Black?" (BBC) as Presenter (director: Sam Lewens)
 Soap Fever ITV2 (1999-2003)

Radio presenting

 Chrysalis Radio, Galaxy 102 FM The Adam Cole Breakfast Show, as writer, presenter and the part of Sticker Vicar
 Faze FM Kiss 102, The Grainne Landowski Breakfast Show (Faze Radio) as Co-Host and writer.

DJ
Lucas is also a disc jockey having worked at Nightclubs and Venues all around the UK (including the infamous Hacienda nightclub), and in the USA where he DJ'd the America's Got Talent wrap party at CBS Studios.

Theatre
 The Last Chair as Man (24:7 Theatre Festival)
 Granny Must Die as Devil/Bishop (24/7 Theatre Festival)
 The Dumb Waiter as Ben (Not the International Theatre Festival)
 Noises Off as Garry/Roger (Guide Bridge Theatre)
 Loot as Dennis (Guide Bridge Theatre)
 The Funny Farm (Improvisation) (Guide Bridge Theatre)
 Stab/Zombie (Edinburgh Festival (Aspects Theatre Company)
 The Best Little Whorehouse in Texas as Melvin p Thorpe (Aspects Theatre Company)
 Chicago as Billy Flynn (Aspects Theatre Company)
 The Tempest as Antonio (Aspects Theatre Company)
 Grease as Teen Angel (Aspects Theatre Company)

Cabaret
 The Funny Farm Toured as part of Improvised Comedy Group (1999–2000)
 Hosted Mad abbott Cabaret Edinburgh Festival (1992 and 1995)

Awards
In 1999 The Galaxy 102 Breakfast Show was Awarded the Gold for best breakfast show and the Bronze Award for the 'Sticker Vicar'. In 2000, the Galaxy 102 Breakfast Show was awarded a silver Sony Award, Karl's third Sony Award. Peter Kay's Britain's Got the Pop Factor... and Possibly a New Celebrity Jesus Christ Soapstar Superstar Strictly on Ice was Peter Kay's first original show for over four years, and pulled in a massive 7.1 million viewers – making it one of Channel 4's highest rated shows of all time. Winner of 'Best Comedy Performance' at the RTS Awards – describing it as "brilliantly visually realised, and a perfect parody of the genre"; the series received 'Best British Comedy Television Programme' award from BAFTA LA and the 'Best Music/Variety Program' at the Banff World Television awards and also received an Emmy nomination for International Comedy in 2009.

References

External links

 
 Northern Elastic Theatre Company 
 Karl Lucas, guidebridge.co.uk; accessed 29 September 2015

1972 births
Living people
English comedy writers
English male television actors
English male comedians
English male radio actors
English radio presenters
Academics of the University of Salford
Writers from Manchester